Dave Gnaase (born 26 December 1996) is a German professional footballer who plays as a midfielder for 1. FC Saarbrücken.

Career 
Gnaase came through the youth ranks at 1. FC Heidenheim, and made nine appearances for the senior team.

Gnaase joined SpVgg Neckarelz on loan ahead of the 2016–17 season.

Gnaase signed for Würzburger Kickers ahead of the 2018–19 season. In two seasons with the team, Gnaase scored seven goals in 74 matches across all competitions.

Ahead of the 2020/21 season, Gnaase joined 3. Liga team KFC Uerdingen 05.

On 24 May 2021, it was announced that Gnaase had signed with 3. Liga team 1. FC Saarbrücken.

References

External links
 

1996 births
Living people
People from Schwäbisch Gmünd
Sportspeople from Stuttgart (region)
German footballers
Footballers from Baden-Württemberg
Association football midfielders
2. Bundesliga players
3. Liga players
1. FC Heidenheim players
SpVgg Neckarelz players
Würzburger Kickers players
KFC Uerdingen 05 players
1. FC Saarbrücken players